The Society of Global Health Researchers in Action (SOGHR) is a student-run 501(c)(3) not-for-profit organization founded in 2006 by students at Colorado State University and Eastern Virginia Medical School. Based in Fort Collins, Colorado, SOGHR is "dedicated to supporting students and early career researchers in the global health sciences."

See also 
Public health
Primary health care
Sustainable development
Millennium Development Goals

External links 
SOGHR Official Website
The Center for the New Energy Economy
The Colorado Water Institute
National Renewable Energy Laboratory

Non-profit organizations based in Colorado